Rex Aubrey (4 February 1935 – 20 April 2021) was an Australian freestyle swimmer. He competed in the 100 m and 4 × 200 m relay events at the 1952 Olympics and finished sixth in the 100 m individual event. Two years later he won two medals at the 1954 British Empire and Commonwealth Games.

References

External links
 

1935 births
2021 deaths
Australian male freestyle swimmers
Olympic swimmers of Australia
Swimmers at the 1952 Summer Olympics
Commonwealth Games medallists in swimming
Commonwealth Games gold medallists for Australia
Commonwealth Games bronze medallists for Australia
Swimmers at the 1954 British Empire and Commonwealth Games
People from the Central West (New South Wales)
Sportsmen from New South Wales
20th-century Australian people
Medallists at the 1954 British Empire and Commonwealth Games